Slime & B is a collaborative commercial mixtape by American singer Chris Brown and American rapper Young Thug. It was released on May 5, 2020, by Chris Brown Entertainment under exclusive licensing to RCA. The mixtape includes guest appearances from Gunna, Future, Too $hort, E-40, among others. "Go Crazy" was released as the mixtape's lead single, and became one of the most successful songs for both artists, peaking at number 3 on the Billboard Hot 100 and spending more than one full year on the chart.

Background and recording
Previously, Brown and Young Thug collaborated on the official remix of Brown's song "Wrist", contained in OHB and Brown's collaborative mixtape Before the Trap: Nights in Tarzana, on the free-released track "Dat Night", also featuring Trey Songz, and on "High End", a promotional single from Brown's acclaimed eighth studio album Heartbreak on a Full Moon, also featuring Future.

The mixtape was entirely done at Brown's house during the very first stages of COVID-19 pandemic. It was announced by both artists through their Instagram pages on April 29, with its tracklist being revealed a day before its dropping. After its release, Young Thug revealed that, after spending days recording demos for his verses and elaborating them, he recorded all their official versions in a day. The sound engineer of the mixtape, Patrizio Pigliapoco, talked about the making of the mixtape during an interview with the magazine Revolt, saying that: "It was some days of 30-40 people in Chris' house. Young Thug's crew is massive. It wouldn't be a party, but it would be a kickback while we made the mixtape".

The mixtape was announced on April 6, 2020, by Brown on his Instagram account, and on April 28, 2020, the title and release date set for Brown's 31st birthday were announced.

Critical reception 

The mixtape received a positive response from the general public. Kenan Draughorne of HipHopDX praised the mixtape, saying that on the project, both artists "pair with each other beautifully, creating their best collaborative tape to date", defining it as a "fun-filled amusement park from start to finish, bursting with color from both the acclaimed vocalists and the production beneath them". Draughorne called "Go Crazy" the mixtape's best song. Joe Budden of Complexs Everyday Struggle called the collaboration project "unexpected" and said that "being a mixtape, the project obviously isn't and wasn't supposed to be as majestic or inventive as Brown's latest two albums. It's still a well-done tuneful project of 'fun music' that can be easily listened and enjoyed at any time".

Commercial performance 
Slime & B debuted on the charts after being initially available for free on SoundCloud, as well as spending only three days of activity on digital retailers and streaming services. It debuted at number 55 on the US Billboard 200.

Track listing
Credits adapted from Tidal.

Notes
  signifies a co-producer
  signifies an uncredited co-producer
  signifies an uncredited additional producer
 "Help Me Breathe" originally appeared in the Datpiff and Soundcloud release, however, was added to streaming services 3 days later.

Sample credits
 "Go Crazy" contains a portion of the composition "Drag Rap (Triggerman)", written by Orville Hall, and Phillip Price, as performed by The Showboys.

Charts

Weekly charts

Year-end charts

References

2020 albums
Chris Brown albums
Young Thug albums
RCA Records albums
2020 mixtape albums
Albums produced by Murda Beatz
Albums produced by T-Minus (record producer)
Albums produced by Wheezy
Collaborative albums
Albums produced by OG Parker